

Dukes and princes

Marquesses

Counts

Barons

References

Sources 

 
 
 
 
 
 
 
 
 
 
 
 

Croatian nobility
Hungarian nobility
Jewish-Hungarian families